Dušanka Juko (born 26 June 1984) is a Croatian footballer who plays as a midfielder. She has been a member of the Croatia women's national team.

References

1984 births
Living people
Women's association football midfielders
Croatian women's footballers
Croatia women's international footballers
Croatian Women's First Football League players
ŽNK Osijek players